Chen Yi-chi (born 27 August 1972) is a Taiwanese politician who was a co-founder and the first chairperson of the Taiwan Statebuilding Party.

References

External links

 

1972 births
Living people
Taiwan Statebuilding Party chairpersons
Politicians of the Republic of China on Taiwan from Chiayi County
Leiden University alumni
National Chengchi University alumni